In baseball statistics, an error is an act, in the judgment of the official scorer, of a fielder misplaying a ball in a manner that allows a batter or baserunner to advance one or more bases or allows an at bat to continue after the batter should have been put out. In baseball and softball, the second baseman is a fielding position in the infield, commonly stationed between second and first base. The second baseman often possesses quick hands and feet, needs the ability to get rid of the ball quickly, and must be able to make the pivot on a double play. In addition, second basemen are almost always right-handed. Only four left-handed throwing players have appeared as second basemen in the major leagues since 1950; one of the four, Gonzalo Márquez, was listed as the second baseman in the starting lineup for two games in 1973, batting in the first inning, but was replaced before his team took the field on defense, and none of the other three players lasted even a complete inning at the position. In the numbering system used to record defensive plays, the second baseman is assigned the number 4.

The list of career leaders is dominated by players from the 19th century, when fielding equipment was very rudimentary; baseball gloves only began to steadily gain acceptance in the 1880s, and were not uniformly worn until the mid-1890s, resulting in a much lower frequency of defensive miscues. All but three of the top 21 players in career errors began playing in the 19th century – including the top 13, ten of whom played their entire careers before 1900; only one of the top 21 played more than two games after 1920. None of the top 25 were active after 1930, with the top eight players active after 1926 all being members of the Baseball Hall of Fame; none of the top 49, and only eight of the top 77, were active after 1953. The top 59 single-season totals were all recorded before 1895, the top 192 were recorded before 1928, and the top 410 were recorded before 1946. To a large extent, the leaders reflect longevity rather than lower skill. Joe Morgan, whose 244 errors are the most by any second baseman since 1945, won five Gold Glove Awards for defensive excellence.

Fred Pfeffer, who retired in 1897 after having set National League (NL) records for career games, putouts and assists as a second baseman, is the all-time leader in career errors as a second baseman with 857 – nearly twice as many as any player whose career began after 1900, and over three times as many as any player who reached the major leagues after 1930; he is the only second baseman with over 800, and also holds the NL record of 781. Bid McPhee (792) and Cub Stricker (701), whose careers ended in 1899 and 1893 respectively, are the only other second basemen to commit more than 700 career errors. Robinson Canó, who had 124 errors through the 2021 season to place him tied for 144th all-time, is the leader among active players.

Key

List

Other Hall of Famers

References

External links

Baseball-Reference.com

Major League Baseball statistics
Major League Baseball lists